Blade and Termeh is a 2019 Iranian film written and directed by Kiumars Pourahmad. The film premiered at the 37th Fajr Film Festival.

Storyline 
Termeh (Diba Zahedi) is a young girl who lost her father as a child and after her father died, her mother left her and went to United States. So during this time Jahan (Hooman Barghnavard) has kept the Termeh. Now, after years, Leili has returned to Iran to take Termeh with her to the United States.In the meantime, the secrets of the past are revealed for Termeh…

Cast 
 Diba Zahedi as Termeh
 Pejman Bazeghi as Amir
 Mehran Rajabi as Saed
 Laleh Eskandari as Leili (Mother of Termeh)
 Hooman Barghnavard as Jahan
 Korosh Soleimani as Payam (Father of Termeh)
 Sharareh Ranjbar as Gelareh
 Mitra Ghorbani as Mitra
 Simon Simonian as Airport Security
 Avisa Sajjadi as Termeh's childhood
 Faranak Koshafar
 Pedram Abdan
 Navid Kohfallah
 Miad Abedizadeh

References

 New Iranian film ‘Blade & Termeh’ starring ifilm series stars Pejman Bazeghi and Houman Barghnavard is in the making. en.ifilmtv.com
 Fajr Film Festival unveils official lineup tehrantimes.com
 ليست كامل عوامل فيلم تيغ و ترمه sourehcinema.com (Persian language)
 حاشیه‌نگاری بر لیست فیلم‌های سودای سیمرغ فجر isna.ir/news (Persian language)
 پایان فیلمبرداری «تیغ و ترمه» پوراحمد + عکس isna.ir/news (Persian language)
 «تیغ و ترمه» فرم حضور در جشنواره ملی فیلم فجر را پر کرد mehrnews.com (Persian language)

External links
 

2019 films
Iranian drama films
2010s Persian-language films